The 2004–2005 Scottish Challenge Cup was the 14th season of the competition, competed for by all 30 members of the Scottish Football League. The defending champions were Inverness Caledonian Thistle, who defeated Airdrie United 2–0 in the 2003 final. Inverness Caledonian Thistle did not compete in the tournament after being promoted to the Scottish Premier League.

The final was played on 7 November 2004, between Falkirk and Ross County, at McDiarmid Park, Perth. Falkirk won 2–1.

Schedule

First round 
Clyde and Stranraer received random byes into the second round.

Source: ESPN Soccernet

Second round 

Source: ESPN Soccernet

Quarter-finals

Semi-finals

Final

External links 
 ESPN Soccernet Scottish League Challenge Cup page 

Scottish Challenge Cup seasons
Challenge Cup